The Wetter is a  river in the state of Hesse, Germany. It is a right tributary to the Nidda which itself is a right tributary of the Main.

After leaving the Vogelsberg mountain range the river flows through the Wetterau, a fertile landscape just north of Frankfurt, which is named after the river. The principal towns along the river are Laubach, Lich, Bad Nauheim and Friedberg. The Wetter receives its largest tributary, the Usa, at Friedberg just before it finally joins the Nidda at Niddatal-Assenheim.

Tributaries

The following rivers are tributaries to the river Wetter (from source to mouth):

Left: Heegbrückerbach

Right: Hirtenbach, Laubach, Lauter, Äschersbach, Albach, Usa, Straßbach

References

Kümmerly+Frey: The New International Atlas. Rand McNally (1980)
List of German rivers (German)

External links

Rivers of Hesse
Rivers of the Vogelsberg
Rivers of Germany